Yehuda Leib Maimon (11 December 1875 – 10 July 1962, also known as Yehuda Leib HaCohen Maimon) was an Israeli rabbi, politician and leader of the Religious Zionist movement. He was Israel's first Minister of Religions.

Biography
Yehuda Leib Fishman (later Maimon) was born  in Mărculești, in the Soroksky Uyezd of the Bessarabia Governorate (then part of the Russian Empire, now in Moldova), Maimon studied in a number of yeshivot and received rabbinic ordination from Rabbi Yechiel Michel Epstein, the author of the Aruch HaShulchan.  He was one of the founders of the Mizrachi movement in 1902. By this time Maimon had moved to the Russian Empire, where he was arrested several times for Zionist activity. He was a delegate to the ninth Zionist Congress in 1909, and attended every one until Israeli independence in 1948.

In 1913, Maimon immigrated to Palestine (then part of the Ottoman Empire), but was expelled during World War I. He moved to the United States, where he organised the Mizrachi movement.

His sister, Ada also served as a member of the Knesset for Mapai. One of his great grand-daughters is the model Nina Brosh.

Political career
After returning to Mandate Palestine (now under British control) in 1919, Maimon became leader of Mizrachi in the country and together with Abraham Isaac Kook he helped establish the Chief Rabbinate. He was elected to the board of the Jewish Agency in 1935. In 1936, he founded Mossad Harav Kook, a religious research foundation and notable publishing house named in honor of Rabbi Abraham Isaac Kook.

In 1946, he was imprisoned by the British in Latrun during Operation Agatha. The British detained him on the Jewish Sabbath, and he objected to riding in a vehicle on the Sabbath, and offered instead to walk to a nearby police station. The British refused his offer and forced him into a waiting car.

Maimon helped draft Israel's Declaration of Independence and was one of its signers. He was appointed Minister of Religions and Minister of War Victims in the provisional government established immediately after independence. He was elected to the first Knesset in 1949 as a member of the United Religious Front (an alliance of Agudat Yisrael, Poalei Agudat Yisrael, Mizrachi and Hapoel HaMizrachi) and retained his ministerial role in the first and second governments. He was the driving force behind a failed effort to reestablish the Sanhedrin. He lost his seat in the 1951 elections.

Awards and recognition
In 1958, he was awarded the Israel Prize for his contribution to Rabbinical literature.

See also
List of Israel Prize recipients

References

External links

"Renewing the Sanhedrin in our New State"  (English translation)

1875 births
1962 deaths
People from Florești District
People from Soroksky Uyezd
Moldovan Jews
Bessarabian Jews
Emigrants from the Russian Empire to the Ottoman Empire
Jews in Mandatory Palestine
Israeli people of Moldovan-Jewish descent
Mizrachi (political party) politicians
United Religious Front politicians
Jewish National Council members
Ministers of Religious affairs of Israel
Members of the Assembly of Representatives (Mandatory Palestine)
Signatories of the Israeli Declaration of Independence
Members of the 1st Knesset (1949–1951)
20th-century Russian rabbis
Heads of the Jewish Agency for Israel
Israel Prize Rabbi recipients
Israel Prize in Rabbinical literature recipients
20th-century Israeli rabbis